Lascar is a stratovolcano in Chile within the Central Volcanic Zone of the Andes, a volcanic arc that spans Peru, Bolivia, Argentina and Chile. It is the most active volcano in the region, with records of eruptions going back to 1848. It is composed of two separate cones with several summit craters. The westernmost crater of the eastern cone is presently active. Volcanic activity is characterized by constant release of volcanic gas and occasional vulcanian eruptions.

Lascar has been active since at least 56,000 years ago, though some argue for activity beginning 220,000 years ago. The first known activity occurred at the eastern cone and was characterized by lava flows, before shifting to the western cone where lava domes were emplaced. An eruption event known as Piedras Grandes was followed by the large Soncor eruption. A new western edifice was constructed on top of the Soncor vent, during the Holocene activity then shifted again to the eastern edifice and continues there to this day. The magma supplied to the volcano ultimately comes from the subduction of the Nazca Plate beneath the South America Plate. A number of other volcanoes are found in the region, such as Aguas Calientes, Cordon de Puntas Negras and the giant La Pacana caldera.

The volcano experienced at least three major eruptions throughout its history: One is the Soncor eruption about 26,450 ± 500 years ago, another in 7,250 BCE and the third in 1993. The first of these eruptions released  of material and is known as the Soncor eruption. The largest eruption of Lascar known to recorded history occurred in April 1993 and caused ash fall as far away as Buenos Aires. Because Lascar is located in a remote area, it is monitored primarily by remote sensing. Explosive eruptions are the greatest hazard at Lascar.

Etymology

The name originates from the Atacameño word láskar or lassi, thought to refer to the shape of the volcano. Other names for the volcano are Hlàscar, Hlascar, Ilascar, Kar Las, Laskar, Toconado and Toconao.

Human use 

, it had a population of 50 inhabitants. , stockbreeding and farming were the principal economic activities in Talabre.

Lascar, like El Tatio, is a destination for volcano tourism. Unlike the neighbouring volcanoes Acamarachi, Licancabur and Quimal, there is no evidence of archeological sites on Lascar, possibly because of the volcanic activity. However, the inhabitants of the town of Camar consider Lascar a protective mountain spirit and in Susques (Argentina) it is believed that snow will fall if Lascar is steaming strongly.

Geography and geological context

Regional setting

Volcanoes in the Andes occur in four separate regions: the Northern Volcanic Zone between 2°N and 5°S, the Central Volcanic Zone between 16°S and 28°S, the Southern Volcanic Zone between 33°S and 46°S, and the Austral Volcanic Zone, south of the Southern Volcanic Zone. These volcanic zones are separated by areas where recent volcanism is absent; one common theory is that the subduction processes responsible for volcanism form a subducting plate that is too shallow to trigger the formation of magma. This shallow subduction appears to be triggered by the Nazca Ridge and the Juan Fernandez Ridge; the areas where they subduct beneath the Peru-Chile Trench coincide with the limits of the Central Volcanic Zone. It is possible that when these ridges are subducted, the buoyancy they carry disrupts the subduction process and reduces the supply of water, which is important for the formation of melts.

Of these volcanic zones, the Central Volcanic Zone of which Lascar is a member of is the largest, covering parts of Peru, Bolivia, Argentina and Chile. The Central Volcanic Zone is located between two areas where subduction is shallower and volcanic activity is absent. In the Central Volcanic Zone, volcanism has been active for 120 million years, although it has undergone eastward migration during this time. Water released from the subducting plate triggers the formation of basaltic magmas that are then injected into the crust.

Many of these volcanoes are covered by snow and ice. A number of supervolcanoes exist in the Central Volcanic Zone, they are part of the Altiplano-Puna volcanic complex.

Local setting

The volcanism of Lascar relates to the subduction of the Nazca Plate beneath the South America Plate. The Central Andes contain many hundreds of volcanoes, extending over the countries of Argentina, Bolivia, Chile and Peru. Volcanic centres include calderas and associated large ignimbrites, lava domes and stratovolcanoes; among the better-researched volcanoes are Galan, Nevados de Payachata, Ollague, Purico Complex, San Pedro–San Pablo, La Pacana, Tata Sabaya and Tumisa. Over 44 volcanoes in the region are considered potentially active, with a number of young volcanoes featuring fumarolic or hydrothermal activity. Guallatiri, for example, features fumarolic activity that is visible in satellite images. Also fumarolically active are: Sabancaya, El Misti, Ubinas, Tacora, Isluga, Irruputuncu, Olca, Ollague, San Pedro, Putana and Lastarria. The largest historical eruption occurred at Huaynaputina in 1600. Given the low population density around many of these volcanoes, there is often little information on their activity.

Geographically, the area of Lascar is located between the Altiplano and the Salar de Atacama  farther west; the terrain at Lascar dips in the direction of the Salar.

Lascar is located in the main volcanic arc, on the western margin of the Altiplano. Aguas Calientes is older than Lascar, and it might share a magma chamber. Miocene–Quaternary volcanic centres in the neighbourhood include Cerro Negro in the north, Acamarachi northeast, Tumisa southwest, and the Cordon de Puntas Negras in the south, which Lascar is sometimes considered to be part of. Tumisa, to the south of Lascar, was active between 2.5 and 0.4 million years ago, is composed of dacite and surrounded by pyroclastic flow deposits. East of Lascar lies the La Pacana caldera.

These valleys were probably formed by erosion during glacial periods. The valleys drain the western, northern and southwestern slopes of Lascar. The southeastern slopes drain into Laguna Lejía which is close to the volcano, and the northwestern slope drains through the Quebrada de Morro Blanco.

Lascar is located atop of a ridge formed by the  Cerro Corona and  Cerro de Saltar lava domes, south and north of Lascar, respectively. Cerro Corona gets its name from a crown-shaped structure at its top. These lava domes are about 5 million years old, and are composed of dacite and smaller amounts of pyroxene andesite, along with rhyolite and  visible minerals including biotite and hornblende. An eruption 16,700 years ago from Corona deposited tephra containing biotite and quartz in Laguna Lejía and generated a rhyodacitic lava flow. Another debris flow from Corona spread towards Salar de Atacama.

Geology

Lascar is a steep volcano formed by two irregularly shaped truncated cones that extend east–west, on a trend that includes Aguas Calientes. Six craters are located on the volcano, but sometimes only five craters are counted, in which case the central crater is considered to be the active one. The extinct western cone (also known as Apagado) is composed of layers of lava and pyroclastics. Its large crater is filled by another cone, which forms the highest summit of the Lascar volcano. Immediately east of it lies the eastern cone, which is contiguous with the western cone. The eastern cone (also known as Activo) is capped off with three distinct craters which are delimited by arcuate fractures. The craters show evidence that activity has migrated westward. In 1985, a  hot spot in this crater was observed in satellite images. There are many fumaroles along the rim of the inner crater.

Layers of lava and pyroclastics are discernible in the craters. These craters are not collapsed calderas, and there is no evidence of the deposits a large explosion would produce. Remnants of a previous edifice are visible in the craters; this older edifice constitutes the bulk of the eastern cone. There are traces of a collapse of the volcano towards the northeast, with an associated horseshoe-shaped scar.

Large lava flows are noticeable on the flanks of the volcano, with a total of eight lava flows recognized. They extend from the summit craters, although none of them appear to be associated with the currently active crater. Flows from the first stage of Lascar's activity are exposed at its western foot, while lava flows are buried beneath pyroclastic material on the eastern flank. A  lava flow on the northern flank reaches almost to the village of Talabre. The flow advanced just north of the head of Quebrada Talabre before passing over cliffs and entering it. Another lava flow on the southwest flank is known as the Capricorn Lava. This dacitic lava was erupted on Lascar at high altitude and has a blocky surface. It features well developed levees and a  flow front. Its rocks have a pale gray-blue colour, and their composition resembles the Soncor flow, despite more mafic lavas and pyroclastics being erupted in the time period between the emplacement of the Soncor flow and the Capricorn Lava.

An early pyroclastic flow, the Saltar Flow, is exposed on the eastern flank. It was emplaced after the collapse of the oldest edifice, covering Aguas Calientes' western slopes. The flow deposit was later modified by glacial activity. The Soncor flow is found primarily on the western side of Lascar, with part of it also southeast of Lascar. On the western slope, it buries the even older Piedras Grandes flow, which crops out only at the margins of the Soncor flow. The large eruption gave rise to a pyroclastic flow that extended  westward and contained breccia and various magmas. It was accompanied by a Plinian fall deposit. Finally, the andesitic pumice Tumbres flow is found on the northwest–west–southwestern slopes of Lascar.

The Quebrada Talabre cuts into the upper flanks of Lascar and eventually joins the Quebrada Soncor. Lahar deposits are found in adjacent valleys, suggesting that wetter periods had occurred during Lascar's activity. The Quebrada Talabre was scoured by pyroclastic flows during the 1993 eruption, exposing bedrock and Tertiary ignimbrites. Traces of glacial action are found on the older parts of Lascar at altitudes above  and include meltwater gorges, striated rock surfaces, and U-shaped valleys.

The volcano sits above a major local geological trend, the north–south Miscanti Line. Other volcanic centres are also located on this line, including the Corona and Saltar lava domes, and the Miscanti and Lejia volcanoes. The Miscanti Line dissects the Quaternary basement beneath Lascar, and it may be a hinge of a fold that is being propagated by faults. The formation of the first cone at Lascar may have been facilitated by the intersection between the Miscanti Line and another east–west lineament formed by Pliocene–Pleistocene tectonic compression of the region, and the lineament would have worked as an ascent path for magma. At least four alignments of volcanoes are recognized in the region.

Composition

Lascar rocks consist of andesite and dacite. These rocks have a composition mainly characterized as "two-pyroxene", but the old Piedras Grandes and Soncor rocks contain hornblende. Other minerals include anhydrite, augite, plagioclase which is also the dominant phenocryst phase in Lascar rocks, apatite, ilmenite, magnetite, olivine, orthopyroxene, phyrrotite, quartz, rhyolite in the groundmass, and spinel in inclusions. Dacite has more plagioclase and rhyolite. Additional component minerals found at Lascar include anorthite, augite bordering on diopside, bronzite, fassaite, forsterite, hypersthene, pigeonite and more.

The rocks of Lascar belong to the calc-alkaline series.  concentrations range from 55.5 to 67.8% by weight, and the rocks have medium to large concentrations of potassium. The magmas are contaminated by the local crust, but not to the extent found in the Galan or Purico complex eruption products. The magma interacts with former salar deposits before ascending. The chemistry of Lascar's rocks is fairly similar to those of neighbouring Tumisa volcano.

Magma erupted by Lascar appears to form from the mixing of mafic and more evolved magmas; the 1993 eruption deposits contain bands of different rocks. Specifically, basaltic andesite magma is periodically injected into a magma chamber, where crystal fractionation and mixing processes take place. The process happens frequently, thus the magmas are relatively unevolved; presumably, if the supply of mafic magma is steady, the products are andesitic, otherwise dacite forms. This origin of Lascar magmas is reflected in the textures of rocks. Petrologic investigations indicate that at least three components give rise to Lascar's magmas, an upper crustal one, a mantle component and an enriched component that may come either from the lower crust or the downgoing slab.

Magma petrology implies that there is another reservoir at  depth. There appear to be two distinct chamber systems, an andesitic one that is responsible for the frequent andesite lava and pyroclastic flow activity, and a dacitic one that was involved in the Piedras Grandes and Soncor activities.

The chamber may be surrounded by skarnic alteration. This alteration gives rise to wollastonite and pyroxene-containing skarn, depending on the distance from the magma chamber walls. Metasomatism does further affect rocks derived from magma chamber walls. The conditions at the magma chamber may be comparable to these under which epithermal mineral deposits form. The oxidation conditions in the magma chamber are favourable for the formation of sulfate, but unfavourable for the deposition of sulfide minerals.

A number of xenoliths occur in Lascar's rocks; a large amount of the phenocrysts are ultimately derived from them. Hornfels, skarn, and rocks that are part of Lascar's lava dome ridge are the source of these xenoliths. Minerals encountered in xenoliths include andradite, anhydrite, anorthite, apatite, biotite, calcite, diopside, fassaite, garnet, gypsum, ilmenite, magnetite, monazite, orthopyroxene, perovskite, plagioclase, prehnite, quartz, sphene, thorite, wilkeite, wollastonite and zircon. A number of such xenoliths formed from carbonate rocks that were influenced by magma of Lascar and of other volcanoes such as Tumisa.

Gas emissions

Lascar emits plumes of gas and white clouds of condensed water vapor, mostly over many hundreds of fumarolic vents, which are chiefly located in the active crater. In December 2002, two fumaroles had temperatures exceeding . Total flux is estimated to be , and occurs even between eruptions. 

There are high-temperature fumaroles (temperatures equal to or exceeding ) and low-temperature fumaroles (temperatures of less than ), with noticeable chemical differences between the two; the latter tend to emit far more water than carbon dioxide. The fumaroles also release carbon monoxide, hydrogen, hydrogen chloride, hydrogen sulfide, and smaller amounts of helium. Hydrocarbons and other organic compounds are also found in the low-temperature fumaroles. Trace elements include arsenic, boron and titanium, with smaller amounts of barium, chromium, copper, lead, strontium and zinc. The fumarole gases react with surrounding rocks, forming precipitates and altered rocks.

This corresponds to about 1% of global volcanic sulfur emissions, and is comparable to Kilauea and Villarica. Lascar was a substantial source of sulfur dioxide for the atmosphere around 30° south, reaching a proportion of 20–40% the sulfur over South America and still 10–20% over the South Indian Ocean. In 2005, Lascar was the third-largest source of volcanic sulfur dioxide in the world among continuously active volcanoes, behind Etna in Italy and Bagana in Papua-New Guinea. Since 2014, however, the Peruvian volcanoes Sabancaya and Ubinas have become the largest source of tropospheric sulfur dioxide from the Central Volcanic Zone. There are temporal variations in the output: after a decrease in 2009, sulfur output increased in 2012, probably as a consequence of the arrival of new magma at depth. There is no clear association between periods of degassing and eruptions. Sulfur is released from areas all over the cone, resulting in a noticeable sulfur smell.

They correspond to about 2 and 5%, respectively, of the global volcanic flux of these compounds. Finally, Lascar is vigorous producer of sulfate dust particles, which are released at a rate of about 100,000 trillion particles per second.

Gases are partly supplied from shallow magma; the volume of magma erupted is too small to contain all the exhalations. The release of gas by the magma is favoured by strong temperature contrasts between incoming magma and the magma chamber, and processes occurring during the mixing may explain the high emission of sulfur dioxide by Lascar. The presence of argon and nitrogen in low-temperature fumaroles indicates that air is involved in their formation, although a portion of each of these two gases is non-atmospheric.

Sulfur and chlorine may be derived from the crust, evaporites such as these found at Salar de Atacama, subducted lithosphere or the mantle. Carbon in the gases may come from skarn assimilation. Sulfur isotope data support the notion that evaporite deposits contribute part of Lascar's sulfur. Water appears to be in part magmatic and in part precipitation-derived. The high concentrations of halogens are typical for subduction-associated volcanoes; the halogens are supplied to the volcanoes through subduction-induced processes that act on the crust and the subducting plate.

Electrical conductivity data suggest that a hydrothermal system exists beneath Lascar, but the existence of such a system has been questioned.

Basement

Lascar rests atop the Atana ignimbrite, a rhyodacitic sheet which was erupted by La Pacana caldera 4.5–3.7 million years ago. The Pampa Chamaca and Tuyajto ignimbrites are somewhat younger, 2.6–2.2 million and less than 1 million years respectively. These ignimbrites form a 3° steep slope in the area. Other basement rocks are the sandstone-containing marine Devonian–Carboniferous Lila formation, the red-orange Permian Cas formation containing volcanic rocks and granites, as well as the volcanic Permian–Triassic Peine formation and Cerro Negro strata, which also contain intruded rocks and lake sediments. These formations are not visible in the Lascar area, but they crop out close to the Salar de Atacama. Tertiary sediment and volcanic rocks can also be found. The presence of Mesozoic limestone is indicated by xenoliths in Lascar's lavas; the only place they crop out farther east is in Argentina. This limestone formation has been identified as the Yacoraite formation. Later deposits include the Cenozoic sedimentary Quepe strata. Landforms over this basement include ignimbrites, lava domes, and stratovolcanoes. Exposures of the basement are often delimited by faults.

Eruptive history

Lascar is one of the three most active volcanoes in the Andean Central Volcanic Zone (the other two are the Peruvian volcanoes Sabancaya and Ubinas) and a steady pattern of eruptive activity has persisted for centuries. The volcano persistently features a tall plume of water and sulfur dioxide. Most present-day activity consists of the release of fumarolic gas with additional vulcanian activity that generates eruption columns several kilometres high, typically every three or two years and half of the time during austral spring as well as active deformation of the three active craters observed in interferometric synthetic-aperture radar.

Early activity
The oldest volcanic activity at Lascar occurred between 220,000 and less than 50,000 years ago. Activity has alternated between the eastern and western part of the volcano during its history. The eastern edifice formed first (stage I), erupting andesite containing pyroxene, and eventually forming the Chaile and Saltar pyroclastic flows. The oldest mafic andesites are less than 43,000 years old, while the Chaile and Saltar pyroclastic flows erupted over 26,500 years ago. An alternative dating scheme considers Chaile to be 47,000 ± 16,000 years old and Saltar 167,000 ± 9,000 years old.

The lavas from stage I are mostly exposed north and west of Lascar. At least nine units form the Saltar deposit, with the northern flows displaying flow welding. After the end of stage I, a period of glacial erosion occurred prior to new activity, which created furrows in the Saltar flow. Imprecise argon–argon dating on younger andesites has yielded dates of 14,000 ± 18,000 and 17,000 ± 22,000 years.

Later volcanic activity buried this edifice beneath thin pyroclastic flows. The western edifice generated a complex of lava domes (stage II), which was probably surrounded by a horseshoe-shaped crater open to the west. Possibly, the magma chamber of stage I had almost solidified when the injection of basaltic magma at depths of over  triggered a remelting. Andesite-rhyodacite intrusions occurred beneath the volcano, some of which were still hot when the Soncor eruption tore them out of the ground. An ice cap formed over Lascar at that time, feeding two glaciers that extended northeast and southeast away from the volcano.

Piedras Grandes unit
This unit, formed during stage II, is known as Piedras Grandes,and is exposed on the western slopes below about  altitude. The composition of the Piedras Grandes unit is andesite containing amphibole, basaltic andesite and hornblende. The Piedras Grandes unit is over 26,500 years old, possibly between 63,000 and 100,000 years old. The magmas were formed from a remelted proto-pluton that had been heated and resupplied with volatiles by mafic magmas.

An alternative theory posits that the Piedras Grandes unit formed when an ice cap on Lascar interacted with a block and ash flow erupted by Aguas Calientes.

Soncor eruption
A major Plinian eruption occurred 26,450 ± 500 years ago, releasing  of ejecta, both volcanic ash and pyroclastic flows. The deposits left contain both andesite and dacite, with phenocrysts consisting of apatite, augite, biotite, iron-titanium oxides, orthopyroxene and plagioclase in a rhyolite matrix. The Plinian deposit has a colour ranging from white to creamy. Like the Piedras Grandes rocks, they tend towards high potassium quantities, and resemble other volcanic rocks of Lascar and the Central Andes in composition. The deposits are formed by a Plinian fallout deposit and an ignimbrite rich in lithics.

It is white, heterogeneous and mostly featureless with only weak sorting, but features a noticeable compositional zonation. The ignimbrite features three facies, one rich in breccia, another rich in pumice, and a normal ignimbrite.

Ignimbrite was channeled to the Salar de Atacama by the Quebrada de Chaile, Quebrada de Soncor and Quebrada de Talabre canyons and some smaller valleys, northeastwards by the Quebrada de Morro Blanco and as far as  southeastwards over the Pampa Leija area. Pumices are encased in the ignimbrite as lenses and levees and are also found in the terrain above the canyons. At the time of emplacement, the ignimbrite was still . The Soncor fallout deposit contains a basal gravelly layer and several layers of andesitic and dacitic pumice which also contain lithics. The total volume of the Soncor eruption products has been estimated to be either  dense rock equivalent or  net volume, both minimum estimates. Lithic rocks derived both from the pre-Soncor volcano and the basement are also represented.

The magma erupted was generated in a magma chamber starting from andesite, which underwent complex petrogenetic processes. At the time preceding the eruption, the magma chamber had a thermal stratification; injections of mafic magmas had heated the magma chamber and induced convection.

A volatile phase containing chlorine formed inside the magma chamber and quickly removed most sulfur from the magma. This sulfur extraction was facilitated by the high oxygen content of the magma, which allowed the formation of sulfur dioxide. Water is a principal volatile involved in the processes of Plinian eruptions; the water content of the Soncor and Piedras Grandes magmas was about 4–5%. The Soncor magmas were associated with a volatile phase that underwent extensive interaction with the future eruption products.

The previous volcanic edifice was destroyed by this eruption, which may have formed a caldera. Such a vent or caldera is substantially smaller than the volume of rocks erupted, a discrepancy that is also evident in the 1932 eruption of Quizapu. The Soncor magma chamber may have been too deep to collapse when it was emptied, explaining why no significant caldera was formed.

The Soncor deposit was subsequently affected by glaciation and the stage I edifice by a debris avalanche, which was radiocarbon dated at 22,310 +2,700/−2000 years ago in the Quebrada de Chaile. The Capricorn Lava overlies the Soncor deposits.

Post-Soncor activity
Later, a new stratovolcano grew over the Soncor vent. This volcano was formed by andesite-dacite lava flows (stage III) and scoria. The growth of this volcano was preceded by a period of erosion between 20,800–20,100 and 12,500 years ago, coincident with the Lake Minchin humid period. Glaciers in the region reached their maximum size at that time. The deposits left by this erosional period contain no clear evidence of stage III activity; indeed Lascar was probably inactive between 14,000 and 10,500 years ago. However, an eruption of the Cerro Corona lava dome occurred during this period, and activity of stage III did not commence earlier than 22,300 years ago.

At the end of the eruption, a  caldera and the two western craters formed. The deposits left by this eruption contain basaltic andesite-andesite and were subject to agglutination and welding. Originally considered part of stage III, it was more recently attributed to stage IV given the considerable (6,000 years) temporal gap between the Tumbres eruption and stage III volcanism, and the geochemistry of the rocks. The Manquez agglutinate above the Tumbres deposits was formed either by the Tumbres eruption or by a subsequent stage; a pyroclastic cone in the western crater may be associated with this agglutinate.

Activity subsequently shifted to the eastern edifice. Around 5150 ± 1250 BCE, as obtained by surface exposure dating, the Tumbres-Talabre lava flow was erupted from the eastern crater. The Tumbres-Talabre flow was originally considered to be of late-19th-century age. It probably formed when one of the craters filled with andesitic lava to the point of overflow. This eruption was the last effusive eruption of Lascar, when later lava domes are excluded. The three eastern summit craters formed at the time when the Tumbres-Talabre flow erupted in the remains of the stage I cone. This edifice is the currently active one, with the deepest of its three summit craters being active.

Historical activity
Lascar has erupted about thirty times since the 19th century. Written reports of volcanic activity exist since the 16th century, when the Spaniards arrived in the region, though few records exist from before 1848. Volcanic activity recorded after 1848 consists chiefly of fumarolic emissions and occasional explosive activity. Recorded eruptions occurred in 1858, 1875, 1883–1885, 1898–1900(?) and 1902, ranging from a volcanic explosivity index (VEI) of 0 to VEI 2. The 1933 eruption was seen as far away as Chuquicamata. Another series of eruptions occurred between November 1951 and January 1952; one eruption is recorded from 1940. Eruptions were observed in March 1960, which were accompanied by earthquakes felt in Toconao, as well as in September 1964 when ash fell in Socaire. Yet another eruption sequence occurred between 1959 and 1969. Eruptions in 1972 and 1974 are uncertain. For some eruptions, including the January 1854 eruption, it is not clear whether they occurred at Lascar or Aguas Calientes, and some early reports of volcanic activity at Aguas Calientes probably refer to Lascar.

In 1984, Lascar awakened to new activity; satellite images noted the presence of hot spots on the volcano. Landsat images taken during this time indicate that a lava lake may have existed in the central crater, generating a plume of volcanic gases and, in September 1986, a vulcanian eruption happened and dropped ash in Salta, Argentina. This eruption was first noticed when ash fell on Salta, and was accompanied by anomalies in the heat emission from the volcano recorded by satellite. The eruption was also observed by geologists in Toconao, where the explosion was violent enough to wake up people who were sleeping. The eruption itself lasted only about five minutes and consisted of two pulses. Ash fall in Salta occurred about one hour after the eruption. This eruption was the most significant of the previous two decades, having a VEI of 3. Preceding historical eruptions did not exceed 2.

A  and  lava dome formed in early 1989. Some of the material came from the conduit walls. The lava dome had disappeared, but in early 1992, another lava dome formed, eventually reaching a size of  width and  height, and was accompanied by explosions. It probably started shrinking in April 1992, although the shrinkage was directly visible only in November. Small explosions accompanied the shrinkage until, by March 1993, the dome had disappeared again.

An alternating cycle of fumarolic activity, an accumulation of fumarolic gases in the conduit and lava dome, and explosive activity followed by renewed fumarolic activity have characterized Lascar's activity since 1984. Explosive activity presumably occurs when gases can no longer escape. This occurs because as the magma loses its gas content, the number of pores in it, and thus its permeability to gas, decreases. Further, fractures permitting gas passage are obstructed when the magma contracts. The temperatures of the lava dome can reach . This cycle ended after 1993, probably because the April 1993 eruption modified the conditions in the volcanic system. Alternatively, the cycle may have continued, to reach another lava dome collapse stage in early 2003. While eruptions before 1993 had always been preceded by a reduction in heat radiated from the volcano, such a reduction in 1999–2000 did not lead to an eruption, and when an eruption took place in July 2000, it was preceded by only a brief drop in heat radiation.

1993 eruption
Vulcanian explosions started on 18 April 1993, and on 19–20 April 1993, a major eruption occurred. A phreatic eruption around 14:30 on 18 April formed the prelude to the eruption. At least ten different pulses were observed, generating columns of various heights and forming mushroom clouds. The strongest pulse occurred on 20 April between 6:28 and 9:20 and sent flows towards the northwest.

The eruption columns underwent several collapses, creating pyroclastic flows at least seven to nine times. The first pyroclastic flow was observed around 10:12 on 19 April. Other flows occurred at 12:05, after 13:37, 17:25, 21:35–21:48, 23:40–23:50 and on 20 April at 9:20. On the southeastern flank, the pyroclastic flows formed a fan extending several hundred metres into Pampa Leija. The southern flank flows at first proceeded along a gully before spreading out. The flows left lobate structures that form a stacked deposit, which shows such structures as levees and finger-like toes.

About 30% of these flows were formed by ash and 70% by blocks, with larger fragments accumulating on the margins of each flow deposit. The pyroclastic flow deposits contain lithics from several sources, as well as pumice.

There is a pronounced morphology characterized by a channel upslope and snout-like toes downslope. Flow surfaces display pronounced fractures with a V profile, which developed a year after the eruption. The pyroclastic flow surfaces subsided after the eruption, with pulses of faster subsidence coinciding with the 1995 Antofagasta earthquake and the 2007 Tocopilla earthquake.

The flows were strongly erosive, extracting rocks and material from the bedrock, even far away from the vent. Noticeable erosion occurred in the areas over which pyroclastic flows had passed, forming abrasion surfaces and removing loose detritus from the ground.

These flows took a long time to cool down; in the Quebrada Tumbres, they had not cooled down completely by December 1993. In some parts of the edifice, ejecta formed layers thick enough to undergo landsliding. The deposits and small structures, such as levees and lobes, were conserved by the dry climate in the region.

The ash from the volcano was carried by western wind towards Argentina and the Atlantic Ocean. Ash fall in Tucuman and Santiago del Estero was intense enough that traffic ground to a halt, and air travel was impacted internationally. Ash from this eruption was identified in ice cores from Illimani while sulfates reportedly appeared in ice taken from the Arctic and Antarctica. Larger particles fell closer to the volcano, while smaller particles were carried farther. Volcanic ash deposited close to the volcano was partially remobilized by winds a few days after the eruption.

This eruption was the most significant eruption of Lascar in the last 9,000 years, with a volcanic explosivity index of 4 and a duration of 32 hours, and one of the most significant volcanic eruptions in the recent history of Chile. It caused noticeable changes in the morphology of the volcano, including the formation of a new fracture along the summit craters; however, the summit craters themselves were not heavily altered apart from the formation of a trench across the three craters that runs in west–east direction. The whole volcano did not deform during the eruption sequence. The Quebrada Tumbre was blocked, and its water chemistry noticeably altered, by the eruption. About  of gypsum was deposited in the drainages around the volcano, forming a significant supply of sulfur in the region.

The people of Talabre were evacuated during the eruption to Toconao, although some ignored evacuation orders. There were no injuries or fatalities, however the eruption did lead to water pollution in the region, including increases in cadmium, copper and lead concentrations in local rivers. An increase of mercury from the eruption was detected as far as Laguna del Plata, Argentina. The 1993 eruption was followed by a significant increase in the fluorine content of plants covered by the ash. Regulatory limits on concentrations of other elements in water were also exceeded, although only temporarily.

Post-1993 activity
The eruption record at Lascar becomes more irregular after the 1993 eruption. It started to shrink again by May. By 28 December, the dome had subsided completely in the centre, leaving only its margins. Subsequently, a number of fumaroles were active around the crater. Explosive eruptions, accompanied by the formation of eruption columns reaching heights of several kilometres, sometimes leading to ash fall in Jujuy, Argentina, occurred on 27 February 1994; in July 1994, November 1994, and March 1995; and on 10 May, 20 July and 18 October 1996. During the July 1995 eruption, subsidence was noted on satellite images of the inside of the central crater. The collapse structures during this activity were larger than those noted in previous activity, possibly because the April 1993 eruption had emptied part of the system. Otherwise, activity between 1993 and 2000 was not accompanied by deformation of the edifice.

The eruption lasted for two hours and formed a  eruption column. No lava domes were recorded in the crater during that period.

Further activity occurred in May 2005, with a  ash cloud, and in April 2006. An eruption commenced at 11:35 local time on 18 April 2006. This explosion was strong enough to rattle windows in the school at Talabre. A video taken by the Chilean Air Force on 20 April showed a  pit in the floor of the main crater. The eruption ended around 15:32 on 20 April, although some explosions occurred in the following days. Other eruptions were recorded in November 2006 and July 2007.

Weak eruptions, characterized by earthquakes and the release of plumes, occurred in February–March 2012 and March–April 2013. Between April and June 2013, glow was observed at the summit, accompanied by the occasional release of gray clouds. Glowing was also reported in October and November 2013. The last eruption, on 30 October 2015, created a  column of ash that prompted a raise in the local volcano alert level. This eruption may have been triggered by a precipitation event which added water to the volcan's hydrothermal system. Thermal anomalies from this eruption persisted into 2017 but with a tendency to decrease in number, accompanied by persistent degassing.

Seismic activity 

Seismic activity occurs at Lascar. Research has indicated peculiar patterns, including so called "rapid-fire" events on a background of continuous activity, as well as the occurrence of long-period earthquakes; here and in other volcanoes, this kind of seismic activity is associated with intense fumarolic activity that occurs in the absence of outright eruptions. Harmonic tremor has been recorded at Lascar, perhaps caused by a hydrothermal system. Such tremors may be produced by the movement of liquid materials in the volcano. With the exception of the 1993 eruption, seismic activity associated with eruptions has been sparse. A number of earthquakes were recorded in early February 2012. Between January 2014 and June 2016, about 2–4 volcano-tectonic earthquakes per month were recorded. Long-period earthquakes with magnitudes not exceeding 1.3 were also recorded, with a maximum of 209 events noted in May 2015.

Monitoring and threats

Because of the volcano's remote location, much information on its activity comes from remote sensing.  Lascar's activity has been monitored by Thematic Mapper, which has been used to monitor volcanic activity since 1985, when hot spots were observed on Lascar. The eruptions of April 1993 and September 1986 were both preceded by a reduction of thermal radiation observed by Thematic Mapper.

A monitoring network has been built around the volcano beginning from 2010. These include gas monitoring, seismometers, a weather station and cameras. Unmanned aerial vehicles, occasional reconnaissance flights and infrequent visits to the volcano are also used. The Observatorio Volcanológico de los Andes del Sur in Temuco also employs webcams to watch Lascar.

The National Geology and Mining Service of Chile considers Lascar Chile's 14th most dangerous volcano, and in 2020 classified it as a "type I" volcano. It publishes a volcano alert level for Lascar and has created a volcano hazard map for the volcano. Explosive eruptions and ash falls are the major threat to humans from Lascar. The frequent smaller explosive events commonly occur unexpectedly and can thus endanger people on the mountain. The towns of Tumbres and Talabre may be affected by pyroclastic flows, and ash falls can occur east of the volcano. Such ash falls could potentially hit the towns of San Pedro de Atacama, Talabre and Toconao as well as the Llano de Chajnantor Observatory, the San Pedro de Atacama–Paso de Jama–Jujuy international road and the Sico Pass. Past eruptions caused ash fall in Argentina and disruption of air travel and could have major effects in the Salta Province in case of renewed activity. In 1982, the town of Talabre was moved for safety reasons stemming from flooding and volcanic activity, and ballistic blocks ejected by the volcano are a threat to mountaineers and scientists working on Lascar. Sector collapse and lahars have occurred in the past, but are unlikely to be present-day hazards. 

Heavy metal exposure is a problem for the region. High quantities of arsenic have been observed in local crops. Thallium from the volcano is a pollution hazard in the Talabre area. High nickel concentrations in crops from Talabre appear to be caused by volcanic activity as well.

Climate and biota

The area around Lascar is one of the driest and highest volcanic settings in the world. Persistent snow cover exists on the western and southern slopes of the volcano; it contributes partly to the fumarole water. Steam explosions caused by rainfall have been reported. Lascar is located close to the Atacama Desert, one of the world's driest deserts.

During the glacial periods, the volcano most likely featured small glaciers. The equilibrium line at Lascar was at an altitude of  during the last glacial maximum. Traces of glaciation also exist at Cerros de Saltar. The end of glaciation may have accompanied an increase in volcanic activity, a phenomenon that has been noted at other volcanoes. 8,500 years ago, the climate in the region became much drier, and the amount of erosion decreased substantially.

Due to the dry climate, there is little vegetation at Lascar. Bunch grass and shrubs grow on the volcano's slopes. In the deep valleys, groundwater and streams support more plants.

Volcanic activity at Lascar affects neighbouring ecosystems such as the Aguas Calientes crater lake and Laguna Lejia; flamingos disappeared from the latter after the 1993 eruption and did not return until 2007. Other reports claim that flamingos remained; other animals like donkeys and llamas were seen around the volcano one day after its eruption.

See also
 List of volcanoes in Chile

Notes

References

Sources

Further reading

External links

 Lascar at sernageomin.cl
 
 Atacama Photo Gallery – panoramic view into the crater of Lascar
 SI Google Earth Placemarks – Smithsonian Institution Global Volcanism Program: download placemarks with SI Holocene volcano-data.

21st-century volcanic events
Active volcanoes
Andean Volcanic Belt
Five-thousanders of the Andes
Holocene stratovolcanoes
Mountains of Chile
Quaternary South America
Stratovolcanoes of Chile
VEI-4 volcanoes
Volcanoes of Antofagasta Region
Pleistocene stratovolcanoes